Haluk Pekşen (11 September 1961 – 16 September 2022) was a Turkish lawyer, businessman and politician from the Republican People's Party (CHP) who served as the Member of Parliament for Trabzon since 7 June 2015.

Pekşen was lawyer at "Sledgehammer" plot trials and lawsuit for reestablishing of the Confederation of Progressive Trade Unions of Turkey.

See also
25th Parliament of Turkey
26th Parliament of Turkey

References

External links
 MP profile on the Grand National Assembly website

1961 births
2022 deaths
20th-century Turkish lawyers
21st-century Turkish lawyers
Contemporary Republican People's Party (Turkey) politicians
Deputies of Trabzon
Members of the 25th Parliament of Turkey
Members of the 26th Parliament of Turkey
Turkish businesspeople
People from Trabzon
Istanbul University Faculty of Law alumni